The Chennai Metro is a rapid transit system serving the city of Chennai and its suburbs. The elevated section of the project began operations in June 2015, with the entire elevated stretch operational as of October 2016. The entire project completed within the financial year 2019-2020. About 55% of the corridors in Phase I are underground and the remaining corridors are elevated. Phase II is currently under construction.

Metro stations

List of Proposed Metro Stations in Phase 2 and Phase 1 Extension

Statistics

See also

List of Namma Metro stations
List of Kolkata Metro stations
List of Delhi Metro stations
List of Jaipur Metro stations
List of Mumbai Metro stations
List of Lucknow Metro stations
List of Kochi Metro stations
List of Noida Metro stations
List of Nagpur Metro stations
List of Ahmedabad Metro stations

References

External links
CMRL Homepage

Chennai Metro stations
Chennai Metro stations